William George Rathie (April 1, 1914 – November 26, 1994) was a Canadian accountant and politician. He was the 30th mayor of the city of Vancouver, British Columbia, Canada, serving from 1963 through 1966.

Rathie was born in Vancouver and worked as a tax accountant.  He was first elected to Vancouver City Council in 1959 as a member of the Non-Partisan Association, a civic political party.  In 1962, Rathie wrested the NPA nomination from incumbent mayor Thomas Alsbury, and was elected to succeed him in that office.

Vancouver in the mid-sixties was enjoying spectacular growth in its economy and population, and was well on its way to becoming a major international city.  During his tenure, a 20-year programme for Vancouver's redevelopment, encompassing transportation, low-cost housing, and downtown revitalization was outlined.  Its scope and orientation would lead to controversy and protest following Rathie's term of office.

1914 births
1994 deaths
Canadian accountants
Mayors of Vancouver
20th-century Canadian politicians